Anatoly Mikhailovich Mukasei  (born July 26, 1938, Leningrad, RSFSR, USSR) is a Soviet and Russian cinematographer.

Anatoly  Mukasei graduated from the Gerasimov Institute of Cinematography in 1961 and worked with many famous Soviet and Russian directors, including Eldar Ryazanov, Rolan Bykov, Daniil Khrabrovitsky.

Winner of USSR State Prize (1986). People's Artist of Russia (2009).

Anatoly Mukasei is a member of the Russian Academy of Motion Picture Arts Presidium Nika Award.

Family 
 Father —  Mikhail Mukasei
 Mother —  Elizaveta Mukasei
 Wife —  Svetlana Druzhinina
The eldest son — Anatoly Mukasei, died in 1978.
 The younger son —  Mikhail Mukasei (born January 3, 1966),   Russian cinematographer and film producer.
Grandson —  Maksim.
Granddaughter —  Elizaveta.
 Daughter in law (from August 17, 2012) —  Yekaterina Gamova.

Selected filmography
 Give Me a Book of Complaints (Дайте жалобную книгу, 1964) by Eldar Ryazanov
 Beware of the Car (Берегись автомобиля, 1966) by Eldar Ryazanov
 Attention, Turtle!  (Внимание, черепаха!, 1970) by Rolan Bykov
 Telegram (Телеграмма, 1971) by Rolan Bykov
 Big School-Break  (Большая перемена, 1972) by 	Aleksei Korenev
 The Nose (Нос, 1977) by Rolan Bykov
 While the mad dream (Пока безумствует мечта!, 1978) by Daniil Khrabrovitsky
 The Circus Princess (Принцесса цирка, 1982) by Svetlana Druzhinina
 Scarecrow (Чучело, 1984) by Rolan Bykov
 Secrets of Palace Revolutions (Тайны дворцовых переворотов, 2000-2013) by Svetlana Druzhinina

References

External links
 
 Биография

1938 births
Soviet cinematographers
Russian cinematographers
People's Artists of Russia
Recipients of the USSR State Prize
Gerasimov Institute of Cinematography alumni
Living people
Mass media people from Saint Petersburg